Beatrix D'Souza (born 5 May 1935) is an Indian politician and social worker.  She represents the Anglo-Indian community from Tamil Nadu as a member of the Samata Party (led by Uday Mandal its President).

Education
D'Souza completed a Bachelor of Arts in Economics and Master of Arts in English from Stella Maris College and Presidency College, University of Madras, Chennai (Tamil Nadu). She also holds a Ph.D in Australian Literature and pursued research at University of Western Australia, Perth and University of Monash, in Melbourne, Australia.

Career

Since the beginning of her career, D'Souza has been associated with All India Anglo-Indian Association. She was the Founder-President of Forum of Anglo-Indian Women.

References

Members of the Tamil Nadu Legislative Assembly
1935 births
Living people
Articles created or expanded during Women's History Month (India) - 2014
Social workers
Anglo-Indian people
Indian people of Portuguese descent
20th-century Indian women politicians
20th-century Indian politicians
20th-century Indian educators
Educators from Tamil Nadu
Samata Party politicians
India MPs 1998–1999
India MPs 1999–2004
Nominated members of the Lok Sabha
Social workers from Tamil Nadu
Women educators from Tamil Nadu
20th-century women educators
21st-century Indian women politicians
Women members of the Tamil Nadu Legislative Assembly